Attentat 1942 is a Czech point-and-click adventure game, in which players take the role of Jindřich Jelínek's grandchild. Jelínek was arrested by the Gestapo shortly after the assassination of Reinhard Heydrich, ruler of the Nazi-occupied Czech lands and the leading architect of The Holocaust. The objective of the game is to establish what role he played in the attack, as well as the reason for his arrest. Throughout the investigation, players interview eyewitnesses, discover the family's back story and learn more about life in the Protectorate of Bohemia and Moravia.

Development
The game was developed by Charles University and the Czech Academy of Sciences. It is the first game in the Czechoslovakia 38-89 project, which covers different events from contemporary history. Attentat 1942 is a significantly enhanced version of the game "Československo 38-89: Atentát", which was released in Czech in 2015, adapted and changed for an international audience. Revenues from the game are to be invested into the continuing research and science in their field. The core development team is composed of the lead game designer, Vít Šisler (from the Faculty of Arts), the lead programmer, Jakub Gemrot (from the Faculty of Mathematics and Physics), art director Richard Alexander, and students from Charles University and historians from the Institute of Contemporary History of the Czech Academy of Sciences. The illustrations were created by Peter Novák (Ticho 762), and the music was composed by the band DVA, which also created soundtracks for the games Botanicula and Chuchel. The game was released for Windows and Mac on Steam on October 31, 2017. Subsequent Linux version was made available in Spring 2020 as well as mobile/tablet versions in summer that year. The game is available in Czech, with English, Russian, and German subtitles.

Release 
The game was released on Steam in October 2017. It was available worldwide, except for Germany, where it was banned due to German laws barring games containing Nazi symbols. In May 2018, Attentat 1942 won the "Most Amazing Game" Award at the A MAZE festival in Berlin, although attendees could not play it. In August 2018, the policy of USK, the authority providing age ratings for video games, was changed to allow games with Nazi symbolism to receive age ratings, depending on their individual "social adequacy". Attentat 1942 was released in Germany as the first PC game with Nazi symbolism with the USK age rating after the policy change.

Reception 
The game holds a 75% rating on Metacritic based on thirteen generally favorable reviews.

Rock, Paper, Shotgun stated: "[Attentat 1942] captivates from start to finish by humanizing history brilliantly." Destructoid's review was also positive: "Attentat 1942 will be a treasure not only for a fresh perspective on a widely reported period of time but also for the amount of work that you can see the developers put into making sure their story fit within the confines of history."

Awards 
 "Most Amazing Game" at A MAZE festival in Germany.
 "Best Learning Game" at Games for Change in the U.S.
 "Excellence in Narrative" nomination at Independent Games Festival in the U.S.
 Second place at the Game Development World Championship in Finland
 Czech Game of the Year 2017
 "Educational Game" at The Independent Game Developers' Association Awards 2018 in the UK

References 

2017 video games
Adventure games
Educational video games
MacOS games
Video games developed in the Czech Republic
Windows games
World War II video games
History educational video games
Czech resistance to Nazi occupation in video games